HNLMS Luymes may refer to the following ships of the Royal Netherlands Navy:

 , was a  that was later rebuilt as a yacht
 , a 

Royal Netherlands Navy ship names